Creekmoor was a halt on the former Southampton and Dorchester Railway opened by the  Southern Railway for workers at the adjacent "Oerlikon" munitions factory, later run by Plesseys, now owned by Siemens. The halt was situated ¾ mile south of Broadstone, 1½ miles from Poole town centre and 116 miles 79 chains from London Waterloo. The original line had been opened on 2 December 1872 by the L&SWR, and had closed completely by 2 May 1977; the halt itself opened on 19 June 1933 and closed on 7 March 1966.

Construction

Consisting of two platforms prefabricated in concrete at the railway's own concrete works near Exmouth Junction, the station inherited a pre-cast concrete footbridge from somewhere else. A glazed waiting shelter was situated on each platform, as were  enamel running in boards and several totems. One such totem reached £890 in auction in 2007, and a corroded running in board has also been very highly valued. Two window frames, totems and the nearby wooden, crossing keepers' box was preserved by the Creekmoor Light Railway in 1969 at their narrow gauge line 200 yards down the nearby lane. To the front of the down platform (from Bournemouth West) lay a siding serving Sykes Pottery. The ground frame was taken out of use in June 1969 and the track was removed on 18 October 1970. A siding on the other line served the Ministry of Supply's Munitions Factory from 13 September 1940 until the facility was taken out of use in July 1959.

The site today
The site today lies under the route of the A349 Broadstone Way. The construction of this road means there is now no sign that the halt ever existed.

See also

 List of closed railway stations in Britain

Further reading

External links
 Station on navigable 1946 O. S. map
 Disused stations
 https://web.archive.org/web/20070917093051/http://www.sdjr.net/locations/creekmoor.html
 http://www.railwayramblers.org.uk/tour/tour.htm

Disused railway stations in Dorset
Former Southern Railway (UK) stations
Railway stations in Great Britain opened in 1933
Railway stations in Great Britain closed in 1966
Beeching closures in England